Schoonrewoerd is a village in the Dutch province of Utrecht. It is a part of the municipality of Vijfheerenlanden, and lies about 25 km south of the city of Utrecht. Leerdammer cheese is produced in Schoonrewoerd.

It was a separate municipality in the province of South Holland until 1986, when it became part of Leerdam.

The village was first mentioned in the 14th century as Scoenrewrth, and means "beautiful terp (artificial living hill)". Schoonrewoerd developed around the church on a sandy ridge crossed by the Leerdam-Everdingen. The village centre has been raised by about three metres. The church tower dates from the 14th century. The church itself was damaged by war in 1672 and a storm in 1674, and contains few older elements. In 1840, Schoonrewoerd was home to 239 people. The cheese factory is the biggest employer.

Gallery

References

Former municipalities of South Holland
Populated places in Utrecht (province)
Vijfheerenlanden